Systematized epidermal nevus is a cutaneous condition, an epidermal nevus with a diffuse or extensive distribution involving a large portion of a person's body surface.

See also 
 Linear verrucous epidermal nevus

References 

Epidermal nevi, neoplasms, and cysts